The canton of Haut-Périgord Noir is an administrative division of the Dordogne department, southwestern France. It was created at the French canton reorganisation which came into effect in March 2015. Its seat is in Thenon.

It consists of the following communes:

Ajat
Auriac-du-Périgord
Azerat
La Bachellerie
Badefols-d'Ans
Bars
Bassillac et Auberoche (partly)
Beauregard-de-Terrasson
Boisseuilh
La Chapelle-Saint-Jean
Châtres
Chourgnac
Coubjours
Fossemagne
Gabillou
Granges-d'Ans
Hautefort
Le Lardin-Saint-Lazare
Limeyrat
Montagnac-d'Auberoche
Nailhac
Peyrignac
Sainte-Eulalie-d'Ans
Sainte-Orse
Sainte-Trie
Saint-Rabier
Teillots
Temple-Laguyon
Thenon
Tourtoirac
Villac

References

Cantons of Dordogne